Al-Karamah SC is a Syrian professional football club based in the city of Homs. Founded in 1928, it is considered to be one of Asia's oldest sporting clubs. The club has won eight Syrian League titles and eight Syrian Cup titles. It also was the first Syrian club to win both the league and cup titles in the same year. The club is based at the Khaled Ibn Al Walid Stadium. In 2008 the club formed Board of Honor from a prominent business men of the city of Homs to support the club activities and Dr Mohammed Rahif Hakmi was elected as the board chairman.

The club covers other sports such as basketball, handball, table tennis, tennis and athletics for both, males and females. In addition to boxing, freestyle wrestling, judo, karate, weightlifting and cycling.

History

Early period (1928–1972)
Khaled bin Al-Walid Club was established in 1928 at the time of French mandate through the city’s youth who thought of establishing a sports club that would include them and allow them to practice sports officially. Founders were: pharmacist Lian Traboulsi, Abdul Qader Al Jamali, Haider Al Droubi, Salah Al Husseini, Mamdouh Moussalli, Abdul Rahman Rashad, Nasouh, Yasser, Juma, Shawkat, Raafat Al Atassi, Abdel Moamen Al Sheikha, Burhan Al Droubi and Reda Al Jamali. 

After they founded the club, their first championship was in the game on April 25 1948, where they won the Qatar championship as representatives of the national team Homs after their victory in the final match against the team Aleppo] with two goals to one after the extension, and scored the first goal by the breeder Satea Al-Atassi and the second goal by Qusai Al-Jabri, and Khaled Club maintained its title the following year and then returned to win the Syria championship in 1952 and football was the main game in this club.

On February 18, 1971, Hafez al-Assad issued Legislative Decree No. /38/ regulating the sports movement in the Syrian Arab Republic and as a result, the sports clubs were merged by a decision of the Executive Office of the General Sports Federation No. /59 The date of August 18, 1972, and Al-Karama Club is the outcome of the merger of several civil clubs in the city of Homs, which are the Khaled Ibn Al-Waleed – Al-Wahda – Al-Jihad – Al-Tadamon – Al-Tala’a clubs.

Champions 
In the 1974-1975 season, Al-Karama won the first league championship under the leadership of coach Omar Saleh Agha. Then he took the lead by collecting the League and the Cup for the first time in the Syria season 1982. - 1983 led by Jamil Jarro, and then, during the 1983-1984 season, he wanted to repeat the achievement, so he held the league championship and was not allowed to hold the cup when he was considered a legal loser against Al-Ittihad Al-Halabi despite his progress with the match result due to the rioting of his fans. This meeting was in The semi-finals of the competition, but he returned to carry the Cup of the Republic in the year 1987, and then to repeat his achievement in the 1995-1996 season.

Domestic and continental success (2004–2010) 
so he carried the League Championship and then the Republic Cup led by Abdul-Nafi Hamwi, and competed with Al-Jaish Club seasons 1998 - 1999 and 2000 - 2001 and runners-up led by Muhammad Quwaid, as well as in the 2003-2004 season and the 2004-2005 season as runners-up for the league champion led by Imad Khankan and then returned to the tone of the championships led by Muhammad Quwid by achieving the league championship in the 2005-2006 season, to return He maintains his title in the 2006-2007 season, wins the Republic Cup for the fifth time in its history, collects the double for the third time, and repeats the title. Unprecedented achievement in maintaining the league and cup double for the 2007-2008 season, winning the seventh league championship and the sixth Syrian Cup championship.
And in the 2008-2009 season, Al-Karama started its season faltering after the departure of the management of Riyadh Al-Habal and the departure of the team’s coach, Muhammad Quwid, and some of the team’s stars, and he was threatened with relegation. |Al-Ittihad]] until the two teams were equal in points and the goal difference between them, so that a play-off match was resorted to for the first time in the history of Syrian football in Municipal Stadium in Latakia and Al-Karama won 2-1 in a league he will never forget The club’s fans because of the difficulties the team faced to achieve its title, and it held the title of Cup of the Republic in the same year and became the first Syrian club to win the double for three consecutive seasons.

The club is currently headed by Mortada Al-Dandashy, succeeding Muhammad Harba, who came to succeed Riyad Al-Habbal, and before him, the engineer Nasouh Al-Baroudi, who witnessed dignity during their tenure of office.

AFC Champions League 2006

In 2006 the club reached the finals AFC Champions League campaign, winning most of the major Asian football teams. The club played on the way to the semi-final Al Wahda from the UAE, Saba Battery from Iran with the team was led by the international goal scorer Ali Daei and Al-Gharafa from Qater (Qater League current champions at the time). They finished at the top of group and qualified for the Asian CL quarter-finals with 4 wins and 2 losses.

In the quarter-final the club played Al Ittihad where they lost in the first leg in Jeddah 0–2. In the return match at home, Alkarameh scored 2 goals during the first 90 minutes and the match went into extra time. In extra time, Mohannad Ibrahim scored 2 goals and Al-Karamah ended up winning the game 4–0 which caused a tie with an overall aggregate score of 4–2 causing a great surprise in AFC Champions League history.

The club moved on to play Al-Qadisya of Kuwait in the semi-final. The first leg in Homs, Syria. resulting in 0–0 draw. while Al-Karamah was in possession for 85% of the time. The return leg was in Kuwait. Al-Karamah won the game by scoring in the 14th minute of the match by Aatef Jenyat.

On 1 November 2006, the club played Jeonbuk Hyundai Motors (South Korea) where Al Karama lost the first leg 2–0 in South Korea. In the second leg, Al Karama won 2–1 in Homs but the final aggregate score was 2–3, making Jeonbuk the 2006 AFC Champion League Winner.

Grounds

Supporters and rivalries

Colours and kits

Football achievements

Domestic
Syrian Premier League: 8
Champions: 1974–75, 1982–83, 1983–84, 1995–96, 2005–06, 2006–07, 2007–08, 2008–09
Syrian Cup: 8
Champions: 1982–83, 1986–87, 1994–95, 1995–96, 2006–07, 2007–08, 2008–09, 2009–10
Syrian Super Cup: 2
Champions: 1985, 2008

Continental
AFC Champions League:
Runners-up: 2006
AFC Cup:
Runners-up: 2009

Performance in AFC competitions

AFC Champions League: 4 appearances
2006: Runners-up
2007: Quarter-finals
2008: Quarter-finals
2010: Qualifying play-off – West semi-finals

Asian Club Championship: 1 appearance
2001: First round

AFC Cup: 3 appearances
2009: Runners-up
2010: Quarter-finals
2011: Group Stage

Al-Karamah in Asia
Accurate as of 1 October 2022

Performance in UAFA competitions
Arab Club Champions Cup: 1 appearance
2005: 1st Round

Records
Accurate as of 1 October 2022

Current squad
As of 4 August 2022

Notable former players
For all current and former Al-Karamah SC players with a Wikipedia article see Al-Karamah players.

References

External links
  Al-Karamah Fans society website
  sda al-karameh
  al-karameh online
  al-karameh NEWS

Football clubs in Syria
Association football clubs established in 1928
Homs
1928 establishments in Mandatory Syria